Manu Rishi Chadha (born 3 January, 1971) is an Indian actor, lyricist, script and dialogue writer who works in Hindi films. Rishi is trained under theatre director Arvind Gaur for six years. He won the Filmfare Best Dialogue Award, 2009 for Oye Lucky! Lucky Oye! He also won the IIFA Best Dialogue award for Oye Lucky! Lucky Oye!.

Career 
Manu Rishi Chadha started his acting career in Delhi with the Asmita theatre group. He has acted in more than 40 plays with director Arvind Gaur. His major plays are Girish Karnad's Rakt Kalyan, Mahesh Dattani's Final Solutions, Swadesh Deepak's Court Martial, William Shakespeare's Julius Caesar, Dharamvir Bharati's Andha Yug, Dario Fo's Accidental Death of an Anarchist and Eugene O'Neill's Desire Under the Elms.

In 2001, he moved to Mumbai. His first film in Bollywood as an actor was Saathiya in which he played the role of a doctor. He has appeared in more than 25 films.

Filmography

Films

Web series

References

External links
 

Male actors in Hindi cinema
Filmfare Awards winners
Indian male stage actors
Screenwriters from Delhi
Indian male screenwriters
Indian male film actors
Living people
1971 births
Male actors from Delhi